Jim Hogan may refer to:

 Jim Hogan (athlete) (1933–2015), Irish distance runner
 Jim Hogan (hurler) (1928–2010), Irish hurler
 Jim Hogan (outdoor educator)

See also 
 James Hogan (disambiguation)